José Joaquín Esquivel Martínez (born 7 January 1998) is a Mexican professional footballer who plays as a defensive midfielder for Liga MX club Necaxa.

Club career
Esquivel debuted for Pachuca against Querétaro on 24 September 2016.

International career

Youth
Esquivel was called up by Mario Arteaga to compete in the 2015 CONCACAF U-17 Championship, where he wore the captain armband, leading the team to win the tournament. He subsequently participated in the U-17 World Cup to a fourth-place finish.

Esquivel was called up for the 2017 FIFA U-20 World Cup.

Esquivel was included in the under-21 roster that participated in the 2018 Toulon Tournament, where Mexico would finish runners-up.

Esquivel was called up by Jaime Lozano to participate with the under-22 team at the 2019 Toulon Tournament, attaining third place in the tournament. He was later called up for the 2019 Pan American Games, with Mexico winning the third-place match.

Esquivel participated at the 2020 CONCACAF Olympic Qualifying Championship, where Mexico won the competition. He was subsequently called up to participate in the 2020 Summer Olympics. Esquivel won the bronze medal with the Olympic team.

Senior
On 30 June 2021, Esquivel made his senior national team debut in a friendly match against Panama.

Career statistics

Club

International

Honours
Pachuca
CONCACAF Champions League: 2016–17

Mexico Youth
CONCACAF U-17 Championship: 2015
Pan American Bronze Medal: 2019
CONCACAF Olympic Qualifying Championship: 2020
Olympic Bronze Medal: 2020

References

External links
 
 Joaquín Esquivel at Mineros de Zacatecas 
 

1998 births
Living people
Footballers from Zacatecas
Association football defenders
Mexican footballers
Mexico youth international footballers
Mexico under-20 international footballers
Mexico international footballers
C.F. Pachuca players
Mineros de Zacatecas players
Lobos BUAP footballers
FC Juárez footballers
Liga MX players
Pan American Games medalists in football
Pan American Games bronze medalists for Mexico
Footballers at the 2019 Pan American Games
Medalists at the 2019 Pan American Games
Footballers at the 2020 Summer Olympics
Olympic footballers of Mexico
Olympic medalists in football
Olympic bronze medalists for Mexico
Medalists at the 2020 Summer Olympics